Electrochimica Acta is a peer-reviewed scientific journal covering all aspects of electrochemistry. It is the official publication of the International Society of Electrochemistry and it is published bimonthly. According to the Journal Citation Reports, the journal had a 2013 impact factor of 4.086. The current editor-in-chief is A.R.Hillman (University of Leicester).

References

External links 
 

Electrochemistry journals
Elsevier academic journals
Biweekly journals
English-language journals
Publications established in 1959